Speech-language pathology (or speech and language pathology) is a healthcare field of expertise practiced globally. Speech-language pathology (SLP) specializes in the evaluation, diagnosis, treatment, and prevention of communication disorders (speech and language impairments), cognitive-communication disorders, voice disorders, and swallowing disorder across the lifespan. It is an independent profession that is sometimes considered a "related health profession" or allied health profession by professional bodies like the American Speech-Language-Hearing Association (ASHA) and Speech Pathology Australia. Allied health professions include audiology, optometry, occupational therapy, rehabilitation psychology, physical therapy and others. 

The field of speech-language pathology is practiced by a clinician known as a speech-language pathologist (SLP) or a speech and language therapist (SLT), and sometimes as a speech therapist. An SLP is a university-trained individual who provides professional services in the areas of communication and swallowing. SLPs also play an important role in the screening, diagnosis and treatment of autism spectrum disorder often in collaboration with pediatricians and psychologists.

SLPs specialize in the evaluation, diagnosis, treatment, and prevention of communication disorders (speech and language impairments), cognitive-communication disorders, voice disorders, and swallowing disorders. SLPs also play an important role in the diagnosis and treatment of autism spectrum disorder (often in a team with pediatricians and psychologists).

History

Early history 
In the 18th century, speech problems were viewed as symptoms of disease. Speech therapy was therefore provided to treat the diseases using a medical framework.  Jean-Marc Itard, one of the known physicians from this era, practiced the medical model. In his 1817 writings he theorized that stuttering was as a result of a problem of the nerves that control the tongue and larynx. Other therapists (referred to as elocutionists) like John Thelwall were against the medical model. Instead of surgeries, Thelwall's therapy practices included imitation, education and stimulation depending on individual needs.

Development into a profession 
The development of SLP into a profession took different paths in the various regions of the world. Three identifiable trends influenced the evolution of SLP in the United States during the late 19th century to early 20th century: the elocution movement, scientific revolution, and the rise of professionalism. Although there were some groups of self-proclaimed speech correctionists in early 1900s, the professional organization that is now the American Speech–Language–Hearing Association was founded in 1925.

The profession
Speech-language pathologists (SLPs) provide a wide range of services, mainly on an individual basis, but also as support for individuals, families, support groups, and providing information for the general public. SLPs work to assess levels of communication needs, make diagnoses based on the assessments, and then treat the diagnoses or address the needs. Speech services begin with initial screening for communication and swallowing disorders and continue with assessment and diagnosis, consultation for the provision of advice regarding management, intervention, and treatment, and providing counseling and other follow-up services for these disorders. Services are provided in the following areas:
 cognitive aspects of communication (e.g., attention, memory, problem-solving, executive functions).
 speech (phonation, articulation, fluency, resonance, and voice including aeromechanical components of respiration);
 language (phonology, morphology, syntax, semantics, and pragmatic/social aspects of communication) including comprehension and expression in oral, written, graphic, and manual modalities; language processing; preliteracy and language-based literacy skills, phonological awareness.
 augmentative and alternative communication, for individuals with severe language and communication impairments.
 swallowing or other upper aerodigestive functions such as infant feeding and aeromechanical events (evaluation of esophageal function is for the purpose of referral to medical professionals);
 voice (hoarseness, dysphonia), poor vocal volume (hypophonia), abnormal (e.g., rough, breathy, strained) vocal quality. Research demonstrates voice therapy to be especially helpful with certain patient populations; individuals with Parkinson's Disease often develop voice issues as a result of their disease.
 sensory awareness related to communication, swallowing, or other upper aerodigestive functions.

Speech, language, and swallowing disorders result from a variety of causes, such as a stroke, brain injury, hearing loss, developmental delay, a cleft palate, cerebral palsy, or emotional issues.

A common misconception is that speech–language pathology is restricted to the treatment of articulation disorders (e.g. helping English-speaking individuals enunciate the traditionally difficult r) and/or the treatment of individuals who stutter but, in fact, speech–language pathology is concerned with a broad scope of speech, language, literacy, swallowing, and voice issues involved in communication, some of which include:
 Word-finding and other semantic issues, either as a result of a specific language impairment (SLI) such as a language delay or as a secondary characteristic of a more general issue such as dementia.
 Social communication difficulties involving how people communicate or interact with others (pragmatics).
 Language impairments, including difficulties creating sentences that are grammatical (syntax) and modifying word meaning (morphology).
 Literacy impairments (reading and writing) related to the letter-to-sound relationship (phonics), the word-to-meaning relationship (semantics), and understanding the ideas presented in a text (reading comprehension).
 Voice difficulties, such as a raspy voice, a voice that is too soft, or other voice difficulties that negatively impact a person's social or professional performance.
 Cognitive impairments (e.g. attention, memory, executive function) to the extent that they interfere with communication.
 Parent, caregiver, and other communication partner coaching.

The components of speech production include: (i) phonation (producing sound), (ii) resonance, (iii) fluency, (iv) intonation, (iv) pitch variance; (v) voice (including aeromechanical components of respiration).

The components of language include: (i) phonology (manipulating sound according to the rules of a language); (ii) morphology (understanding components of words and how they can modify meaning); (iii) syntax (constructing sentences according to the grammatical rules of a target language), (iv) semantics (interpreting signs or symbols of communication such as words or signs to construct meaning); (v) pragmatics (social aspects of communication).

Primary pediatric speech and language disorders include: (i) receptive and (ii) expressive language disorders, (iii) speech sound disorders, (iv) childhood apraxia of speech (CAS), (v) stuttering, and (vi) language-based learning disabilities. Speech pathologists work with people of all ages.

Swallowing disorders include difficulties in any system of the swallowing process (i.e., oral, pharyngeal, esophageal), as well as functional dysphagia and feeding disorders. Swallowing disorders can occur at any age and can stem from multiple causes.

Multi-discipline collaboration

SLPs collaborate with other health care professionals, often working as part of a multidisciplinary team. They can provide information and referrals to audiologists, physicians, dentists, nurses, nurse practitioners, occupational therapists, rehabilitation psychologists, dietitians, educators, behavior consultants (applied behavior analysis) and parents as dictated by the individual client's needs. For example, the treatment for patients with cleft lip and palate often requires multidisciplinary collaboration. Speech–language pathologists can be very beneficial to help resolve speech problems associated with cleft lip and palate. Research has indicated that children who receive early language intervention are less likely to develop compensatory error patterns later in life, although speech therapy outcomes are usually better when surgical treatment is performed earlier. Another area of collaboration relates to auditory processing disorders, where SLPs can collaborate in assessments and provide intervention where there is evidence of speech, language, and/or other cognitive-communication disorders.

Working environments

SLPs work in a variety of clinical and educational settings. SLPs work in public and private hospitals, private practices, skilled nursing facilities (SNFs), long-term acute care (LTAC) facilities, hospice, and home healthcare. SLPs may also work as part of the support structure in the education system, working in both public and private schools, colleges, and universities. Some SLPs also work in community health, providing services at prisons and young offenders' institutions or providing expert testimony in applicable court cases.

Following the American Speech–Language–Hearing Association's 2005 approval of the delivery of speech/language services via video conference or telepractice, SLPs in the United States have begun to use this service model.

Children with speech, language, and communication needs (SLCN) are particularly at risk of not being heard because of communication challenges. Speech-language pathologists (SLPs) can overlook the significance of supporting communication as a tool for the child to shape and influence choices available to them in their lives, even though it is advised that children with SLCN can and should be actively involved as equal partners in decision-making about their communication needs. Building these skills is especially crucial for SLPs working in settings related to traditional education.

Research
SLPs conduct research related to communication sciences and disorders, swallowing disorders, or other upper aerodigestive functions.

Experimental, empirical, and scientific methodologies that build on hypothesis testing and logical, deductive reasoning have dominated research in speech-language pathology. The definition of innovation should be explicitly considered by speech-language pathologists. Other types of research in the field are complemented by qualitative research, which has also led to new theoretical insights, techniques, and research methods as well as new approaches to how we may deliver our services in ways that are responsive to our customers and communities.

Education and training

United States
In the United States, speech–language pathology is a Master's entry-level professional degree field. Clinicians must hold a master's degree in communicative disorders / speech–language pathology (e.g., MA, MS, or MEd) that is from a university that holds regional accreditation and from a communication sciences and disorders program that is accredited by the American Speech–Language–Hearing Association (ASHA), the profession's national governing body as well as individual state's governing board. Programs that offer the MEd degree are often housed within a university's college of education, but offer the same education and training as programs with a MA or MS degree. Beyond the master's degree, some SLPs may choose to earn a clinical doctorate in speech–language pathology (e.g., CScD or SLPD), or a doctoral degree that has a research and/or professional focus (e.g., PhD, or EdD). All degrees must be from a university that holds regional accreditation, but only the master's degree is accredited by the ASHA.

All clinicians are required to complete 400 clinical hours (25 observation hours often completed during the undergraduate degree and 375 hours of graduate Clinical Practicum). They must pass multiple comprehensive exams also called Knowledge and Skills Acquisition (KASA) exams.

After all the above requirements have been met during the SLP's path to earning the graduate degree, SLPs must state licensure and national certification by:
 Passing the National Speech–Language Pathology Board examination (praxis).
 Successfully complete a clinical fellowship year (CFY) as a clinical fellow (CF) under the mentorship of a fully licensed mentor clinician. The CFY is no less than 36 weeks of full-time experience, totaling a minimum of 1260 hours. During the CFY, the CF cannot earn CFY hours unless they work more than 5 hours in a week and cannot earn any CFY hours beyond 35 hours in a week.
 Receive American Speech–Language–Hearing Association (ASHA) Certificate of Clinical Competence (CCC) and full state licensure to practice, following successful completion of clinical fellowship year(CFY).
 States are responsible for licensure of clinicians and other professionals and, as far as the new SLP, these requirements are often similar to that of the CFY. Following the state licensure procedures and national certification requirements are usually done simultaneously.

To maintain licensure, SLPs are required to participate in periodic earning of Continuing Educational Units (CEU). Continuing education and training obligations:
 Educate, supervise, and mentor future SLPs.
 Participate in continuing education.
 Educate and provide in-service training to families, caregivers, and other professionals.
 Train, supervise, and manage speech–language pathology assistants (SLPA) and other support personnel.
 Educating and counseling individuals, families, co-workers, educators, and other persons in the community regarding acceptance, adaptation, and decisions about communication and swallowing.

Professional suffix:
 Credentials of a clinical fellow typically read as: MA, MS, or MEd, CF-SLP (e.g.: Jane Doe, MA, CF-SLP).
 Credentials of a fully licensed SLP commonly read as: MA, MS, or MEd, CCC-SLP (e.g.: Jane Doe, MA, CCC-SLP), indicating a practitioner's graduate degree and successful completion of the fellowship year/board exams to obtain the "three Cs" the Certification of Clinical Competence, in speech–language pathology.

Methods of assessment
For many parents, the decision of whether or not to enroll students into school-based speech therapy or privately practiced therapy is challenging. Speech–language pathologists work as part of a team alongside teachers, counselors, social workers and parents when in a school setting. Because school-based speech therapy is run under state guidelines and funds, the process of assessment and qualification is more strict. To qualify for in-school speech therapy, students must meet the state's criteria on language testing and speech standardization. Due to such requirements, some students may not be assessed in an efficient time frame or their needs may be undermined by criteria. For a private clinic, students are more likely to qualify for therapy because it is a paid service with more availability.

Clients and patients
Speech–language pathologists work with clients and patients who may present with a wide range of issues.

Infants and children
 Infants with injuries due to complications at birth, feeding and swallowing difficulties, including dysphagia
 Children with mild, moderate or severe:
 Genetic disorders that adversely affect speech, language and/or cognitive development including cleft palate, Down syndrome, DiGeorge syndrome
 Attention deficit hyperactivity disorder
 Autism spectrum disorders, including Asperger syndrome
 Developmental delay
 Feeding disorders, including oral motor deficits
 Cranial nerve damage
 Hearing loss
 Craniofacial anomalies that adversely affect speech, language and/or cognitive development
 Language delay
 Specific language impairment
 Specific difficulties in producing sounds, called articulation disorders, (including vocalic /r/ and lisps)
 Pediatric traumatic brain injury
 Developmental verbal dyspraxia
 Cleft palate

United States
In the US, some children are eligible to receive speech therapy services, including assessment and lessons through the public school system. If not, private therapy is readily available through personal lessons with a qualified speech–language pathologist or the growing field of telepractice. Teleconferencing tools such as Skype are being used more commonly as a means to access remote locations in private therapy practice, such as in the geographically diverse south island of New Zealand. More at-home or combination treatments have become readily available to address specific types of articulation disorders. The use of mobile applications in speech therapy is also growing as an avenue to bring treatment into the home.

United Kingdom
In the UK, children are entitled to an assessment by local NHS speech- and language-therapy teams, usually after referral by health visitors or education settings, but parents are also entitled to request an assessment directly. If treatment is appropriate, an educational plan will be drawn up. Speech therapists often play a role in multi-disciplinary teams when a child has speech delay or disorder as part of a wider health condition. The Children's Commissioner for England reported in June 2019 that there was a postcode lottery; £291.65 a year per head was spent on services in some areas, while the budget in some areas was £30.94 or less. In 2018, 193,971 children in English primary schools were on the special educational needs register needing speech-therapy services.

Children and adults

 Puberphonia
 Cerebral palsy
 Head injury (Traumatic brain injury)
 Hearing loss and impairments
 Learning difficulties including
 Dyslexia
 Specific language impairment (SLI)
 Auditory processing disorder
 Physical disabilities
 Speech disorders (such as oral dyspraxia)
 Stammering, stuttering (disfluency)
 Stroke
 Voice disorders (dysphonia)
 Language delay
 Motor speech disorders (dysarthria or developmental verbal dyspraxia)
 Naming difficulties (anomia)
  Dysgraphia, agraphia
 Cognitive communication disorders
 Pragmatics
 Laryngectomies
 Tracheostomies
 Oncology (ear, nose or throat cancer)

Adults
 Adults with mild, moderate, or severe eating, feeding and swallowing difficulties, including dysphagia
 Adults with mild, moderate, or severe language difficulties as a result of:
 Motor neuron diseases,
 Alzheimer's disease,
 Dementia,
 Huntington's disease,
 Hearing loss
 Multiple sclerosis,
 Parkinson's disease,
 Traumatic brain injury,
 Mental health issues
 Stroke
 Progressive neurological conditions such as cancer of the head, neck and throat (including laryngectomy)
 Aphasic
 Adults seeking transgender-specific voice training, including voice feminization and voice masculinization

See also

 All India Institute of Speech and Hearing (AIIMS)
 Applied linguistics
 Communicative disorders assistant
 List of university speech–language pathology departments
 List of voice disorders
 Motor theory of speech perception
 Neurolinguistics
 Oral myology
 Origin of speech
 Speech acquisition
 Speech Buddies
 Speech perception
 Speech processing
 Speech repetition

References

Further reading

External links
 American Speech–Language–Hearing Association (ASHA) – Communication for a Lifetime
 National Institutes of Health – Voice, Speech, and Language
 The Royal College of Speech and Language Therapists

 
Applied linguistics
Dyslexia
Health care occupations
Medical terminology
Rehabilitation medicine
Rehabilitation team
Special education
Vocal skills
Speech